The  Little League World Series took place between August 21 and August 25 in Williamsport, Pennsylvania. Moreland Little League of San Jose, California, defeated Jaycee Little League of Kankakee, Illinois, in the championship game of the 16th Little League World Series.

Teams

Championship bracket

Consolation bracket

Notable players
Larvell Blanks of Del Rio went on to play in MLB as an infielder from 1972 through 1980

External links
1962 Little League World Series
Line scores for the 1962 LLWS

Little League World Series
Little League World Series
Little League World Series